Kimberley Airport  is an airport serving Kimberley, the capital city of the province of Northern Cape in South Africa. The airport is approximately 10 km away from the centre of Kimberley.

Facilities

Airlines and destinations

Traffic statistics

See also
 List of airports in South Africa
 List of South African airports by passenger movements

References

External links
 Kimberley Airport Homepage
 Aerial Photograph on Google Maps
 
 

Airports in South Africa
Buildings and structures in Kimberley, Northern Cape
Transport in the Northern Cape
Airports of the British Commonwealth Air Training Plan
World War II sites in South Africa